Clarissa Eshuis (born 18 March 1987) is a New Zealand field hockey player. She has competed for the New Zealand women's national field hockey team (the Black Sticks Women) since 2005, including for the team at the 2006 and 2010 Commonwealth Games and at the 2012 Summer Olympics.

References

External links
 

1987 births
Living people
Sportspeople from Hamilton, New Zealand
New Zealand female field hockey players
New Zealand people of Dutch descent
Field hockey players at the 2006 Commonwealth Games
Field hockey players at the 2010 Commonwealth Games
Field hockey players at the 2012 Summer Olympics
Olympic field hockey players of New Zealand
Commonwealth Games silver medallists for New Zealand
Commonwealth Games medallists in field hockey
21st-century New Zealand women
Medallists at the 2010 Commonwealth Games